Digium, Inc. is a communications technology company based in Huntsville, Alabama, and since 2018, a subsidiary of Sangoma Technologies Corporation. The company makes VoIP business phone systems, IP phones, and hardware products. It was founded in 1999 by Mark Spencer.

Digium, Inc. sells all of its products and services directly to businesses and consumers. It also offers its business-to-business communications products, including Digium Cloud Services.

History
In 1999, while a Computer Engineering student at Auburn University, Mark Spencer founded Linux Support Services (LSS). His motivation for starting the company was the high-cost of existing business phone systems. Spencer named it Asterisk, after the programming wildcard symbol and the ”star” phone key. It enabled phone calls over the Internet, providing an alternative to hardware-dependent PBX systems at a reduced cost.

Asterisk-based business phone systems, like Digium's Switchvox, were the first of a new generation of VoIP-based communications solutions that would emerge to compete companies like Cisco and Avaya. Reflecting the company's shift away from Linux support to developing Asterisk and new communications solutions, Linux Support Services was renamed to Digium in 2001.

Digium provides a business phone system powered by Asterisk, either as an on-premises solution or a cloud-based PBX solution. The service can be extended to employee mobile devices.

It is estimated that Asterisk is currently being used by developers in 170 countries, and is running on approximately 1 million servers.

Acquisition  
Sangoma Technologies Corporation announced that they entered into a definitive agreement on August 23, 2018, closing August 31, 2018, expecting to pay US$28 million on a debt-free and cash-free basis, subject to customary working capital adjustments to acquire Digium. The purchase price consists of $24.3 million in cash and 3,943,025 Sangoma common shares (representing $3.7 million based on a ten day volume weighted average price of $1.2214 per common share).  Digium generated approximately $30 million in revenue in its fiscal year ended December 31, 2017, with consolidated assets (net of cash) of approximately $11 million, no debt and a net loss of approximately $4 million. The transaction closed and was finalized on September 5, 2018.

References

Free software companies
Companies based in Huntsville, Alabama
Software companies established in 2002
Privately held companies based in Alabama
Asterisk (PBX)
FreePBX
2002 establishments in Alabama